The Caroline reed warbler or Caroline Islands reed warbler (Acrocephalus syrinx) is a species of Old World warbler in the family Acrocephalidae. It is found only on the Caroline Islands in Micronesia.

References 

Caroline reed warbler
Birds of the Federated States of Micronesia
Caroline reed warbler
Taxa named by Heinrich von Kittlitz
Taxonomy articles created by Polbot